The Elo School is a historic school built in 1906 and expanded in 1915. It is a  building with an enclosed porch and a bell tower. It was named for Reverend John William Eloheimo, a Finnish Evangelical minister, and his daughter Eva Eloheimo was one of its first teachers. The original 1906 structure was built for $612 by Abram Pekkala; the expansion was by Finnish carpenters John Heikkila and John Ruuska. The school was listed on the National Register of Historic Places in 1982.

The NRHP listing includes a  teacher's cottage located behind the school.

It is located southeast of State Highway 55 on Farm to Market Rd., in or near McCall, in Valley County, Idaho.

References

School buildings on the National Register of Historic Places in Idaho
School buildings completed in 1906
Valley County, Idaho
Schools in Idaho
Finnish-American history
1906 establishments in Idaho